Hilton is a civil parish in the South Derbyshire district of Derbyshire, England.  The parish contains seven listed buildings that are recorded in the National Heritage List for England.   All the listed buildings are designated at Grade II, the lowest of the three grades, which is applied to "buildings of national importance and special interest".  The parish contains the village of Hilton and the surrounding countryside.  Apart from a public house, all the listed buildings are houses or farmhouses.


Buildings

References

Citations

Sources

 

Lists of listed buildings in Derbyshire